The 1991 New York City Marathon was the 22nd running of the annual marathon race in New York City, United States, which took place on Sunday, November 3. The men's elite race was won by Mexico's Salvador García in a time of 2:09:28 hours while the women's race was won by Great Britain's Liz McColgan in 2:27:32.

A total of 25,797 runners finished the race, 20,593 men and 5204 women.

Results

Men

Women

References

Results
Results. Association of Road Racing Statisticians. Retrieved 2020-05-23.

External links
New York Road Runners website

1991
New York City
Marathon
New York City Marathon